The CRFU Cornwall Clubs Cup (currently sponsored by Tribute Ales) is an annual rugby union knock-out cup club competition organised by the Cornwall Rugby Football Union. First played for in 1897 but only regularly since 1971. It is open to teams based in Cornwall and play in the Cornish regional divisions (tiers 9 and 10 in the English league system). It is the third highest ranked cup competition in the county after the Cornwall Super Cup and Cornwall Cup.

For the 2016–17 season the competition format has changed. There are now four competitions which take place after the Cornwall League 1 and 2 seasons have finished. The competitions are as follows:

Tribute Clubs Cup – top 4 of Cornwall League 1 
Tribute Clubs Plate – bottom 4 of Cornwall League 2
Tribute Clubs Vase – top 4 of Cornwall League 2 
Tribute Clubs Shield – bottom 4 of Cornwall League 2

Each competition will have a group stage starting in April, with each team playing each other once and the top 2 sides qualifying for the final at a neutral venue in May.  At present all four Cornwall Clubs finals are played at the same venue and on the same date.

CRFU Cornwall Clubs Cup

Cornwall Clubs Plate Finals

Cornwall Clubs Vase Finals

Cornwall Clubs Shield Finals

Number of wins

Cup
 Helston (6)
 Illogan Park (6)
 Wadebridge Camels (6)
 Liskeard-Looe (5)
 Newquay Hornets (4)
 Saltash (3)
 Veor (3)
 Bodmin (2)
 Bude (2) 
 Falmouth (2)
 Newlyn (2)
 Perranporth (2)
 Roseland (2)
 Lanner (1)
 Pirates Amateurs (1)
 Redruth Albany (1)
 St Austell (1)
 RNAS Culdrose (1) 
 Stithians (1)

Plate
 St Agnes (2)
 Helston (1)

Vase
 Illogan Park (1)
 Lankelly-Fowey (1)
 Perranporth (1)

Shield
 Perranporth (2)
 Stithians (1)

1897–98

1898–99

1904–05

Notes

Notes

See also

 Cornwall RFU
 Cornwall Cup
 Cornwall Super Cup
 English rugby union system
 Rugby union in England

References

External links
 Trelawny's Army

Recurring sporting events established in 1971
Rugby union cup competitions in England
Rugby union in Cornwall